"Flag of the Southern Cross" is a poem written in 1887 by Australian bush poet Henry Lawson. The title refers to the Eureka Flag flown at the Eureka Rebellion in Ballarat, Victoria in 1854.  

The victory song of the Australian cricket team — "Under the Southern Cross I Stand" — is said to have been inspired by this poem.

References

External links
 A copy of the poem can be found here.

Poetry by Henry Lawson
1887 poems